{{Infobox Australian road
| road_name    = Jenolan Caves Road
| type         = rural road
| state        = nsw
| image        = Jenolan Caves Road - panoramio - Maksym Kozlenko.jpg
| caption      = Jenolan Caves Road, Hartley 
| length       = 49.7
| length_ref   = 
| direction_a  = Northeast
| direction_b  = Southwest
| end_a        =  Great Western Highway
| end_b        = Edith Road{{small|Jenolan, New South Wales}}
| est          =
| through      = 
| tourist      =  Tourist Route 1
| exits        =
}}

Jenolan Caves Road is a rural road in New South Wales, Australia, linking Great Western Highway at Hartley to Edith Road at Jenolan.

The road is a part of Tourist Drive 1 linking the Blue Mountains to Bathurst via Oberon and Hampton.

Route
The road starts at the intersection of the Great Western Highway and Blackmans Creek Road, then travels south and crosses the Coxs River (Glenroy Bridge). From there it travels southwest and ascends Mount Blaxland, then continues to Hampton and to the Duckmaloi Road intersection. Next it winds south to the 5-Mile section which descends to the Grand Arch. It then goes through Jenolan Caves and leads to a parking lot at Jenolan Caves House. From there it continues northwest on the 2-Mile section before turning into Edith Road at the Kanangra Walls Road intersection.

The road is fully sealed across its entire length. The road is as narrow as one lane on the 5-Mile, Grand Arch, and 2-Mile sections, but the majority of the road is two lanes wide.

History
The passing of the Main Roads Act of 1924 through the Parliament of New South Wales provided for the declaration of Main Roads, roads partially funded by the State government through the Main Roads Board (later the Department of Main Roads, and eventually Transport for NSW). Main Road No. 253 was declared along this road on 8 August 1928, from the intersection with Great Western Highway at Hartley) via Hampton to Jenolan Caves (and continuing northwest to Oberon).

The passing of the Roads Act of 1993'' updated road classifications and the way they could be declared within New South Wales. Under this act, Jenolan Caves Road today retains its declaration as Main Road 253, from Hartley to Jenolan Caves (and continuing northwest via Oberon to Bathurst).

Closures
The road has been closed several times over the years due to bushfires and landslips. Two notable closures were the section between Hampton and Jenolan Caves between January and June 2020 due to bushfire damage and landslips from heavy rain and floods, and closure of the same section in March 2021 due to landslips and parts of the road washed away due to heavy rain and flooding. On May 25th, 2021 the road was reopened at Hampton with Stop / Slow restrictions. The 5-Mile section was still closed. The 2-Mile section was reopened on May 10th, 2021.

Major intersections

See also

 Highways in Australia
 List of highways in New South Wales
 Fish River

References

Highways in New South Wales
Oberon Council